Good Thing Going is the 12th studio album released by Rhonda Vincent. The album was released on January 8, 2008, via Rounder Records. It was her third number-one album on the Top Bluegrass Albums chart, and her second Top 40 album on the Top Country Albums chart.

The album features an appearance by singer Keith Urban, who sings harmony vocals on "The Water Is Wide". Two singles, "I'm Leavin'" and "I Gotta Start Somewhere", were released, however, neither one charted.

Critical reception

Rick Anderson of Allmusic said: "Good Thing Going finds Vincent bringing all of those styles together to create a very solid and enjoyable program." He also said the album is "very highly recommended".

Jonathan Keefe of Slant Magazine gives the album 3 out of a possible 5 stars and writes, "What distinguishes Vincent from the artist to whom she’s most frequently compared, Alison Krauss, is her aggressive vocals; perhaps more so than any contemporary country singer, Vincent’s power and phrasing recall the great Connie Smith."

Lizza Connor Bowen of American Songwriter gives the album 4 stars and writes, "Seven is certainly Rhonda Vincent’s lucky number. This seven-time International Bluegrass Association female vocalist bowed her seventh Rounder album, Good Thing Going, this January. As the title implies, it’s a testament to why she remains the reigning empress of bluegrass."

My Kind of Country'''s Razor X gives the album an A- and says, "Good Thing Going'' is a more eclectic set of songs than we’d heard to date from Rhonda, with elements of traditional folk, Western swing and contemporary country offered up alongside the standard bluegrass."

Exclaim!'s Kerry Doole reviews the album and writes, "Her purity of tone and phrasing are impeccable, and there's a pleasing variety to the material, from slow, hurtin? songs like "Scorn of A Lover? to jaunty romp "Hit Parade Of Love."

Track listing

Personnel
 Hunter Berry – fiddle, mandolin
 Kathy Chiavola – backing vocals
 Stuart Duncan – fiddle
 Kevin "Swine" Grantt – upright bass
 Daniel Grindstaff – dojo
 Andy Hall – resonator guitar
 Becky Isaacs Bowman – backing vocals
 Andy Leftwich – mandolin
 Jesse McReynolds – mandolin
 Russell Moore – backing vocals on "I Give All My Love to You"
 Tom Roady – percussion
 Adam Steffey – mandolin
 Ron Stewart – banjo
 Bryan Sutton – acoustic guitar
 Keith Urban – duet vocals on "The Water is Wide"
 Darrin Vincent – double bass, backing vocals
 Rhonda Vincent – mandolin, vocals
 Josh Williams – acoustic guitar, mandolin, backing vocals

Chart performance

References

2008 albums
Rounder Records albums
Rhonda Vincent albums